Passenger terminal  may refer to:
A train station terminus at the end of a railway line
Airport terminal, a building at an airport where passengers board and disembark from aircraft
 A bus station
 Passenger terminal (maritime), a building in a port or on a dock where passengers board and disembark from passenger ships such as cruise ships and ferries

See also 
 Landing (water transport)